Road Rules: Semester at Sea is the eighth season of the MTV reality television series Road Rules. This season featured six cast members in the shipboard Semester at Sea study program, and followed the cast as they travelled aboard a cruise ship, both while taking school classes and embarking on the various adventures and scavenger hunts typical of Road Rules. This is considered to be the final season of the 'classic era' of Road Rules, as the format of the show would change significantly beginning with Road Rules: Maximum Velocity Tour. This season was filmed in: Nassau (Bahamas), Havana (Cuba), Salvador (Brazil), Cape Town (South Africa), Mombasa and Chyulu Hills (Kenya), Madras (India), Penang (Malaysia), Ho Chi Minh City (Vietnam), Hong Kong (Hong Kong), Shanghai (China), Osaka and Tokyo (Japan), and Seattle (Washington).

A pair of specials — a casting special and a "Passport to Road Rules 8: Semester at Sea" special, aired on June 8 and June 14, 1999, respectively, and the season premiered on June 21, 1999.

Cast

: Age at time of filming.

Missions

Episodes

After filming
Veronica appeared nude in the May 2002 issue of Playboy magazine, along with other alumni of The Real World and Road Rules: Flora Alekseyeun, Beth Stolarczyk and Jisela Delgado. In 2007, she returned to the series as part of the alumni cast of Road Rules 2007: Viewers' Revenge.

In 2007, Ayanna welcomed her first daughter, Madison.

Yes is currently an architect and fabricator and works at University of California, Berkeley.

In 2018, the cast reunited for a 20-year reunion cruise. Ayanna Mackins, Pua Medeiros, Yes Duffy and Shawn Sealy attended the reunion.

The Challenge

Challenge in bold indicates that the contestant was a finalist on the Challenge.

References

External links

Road Rules
1999 American television seasons
Television series set on cruise ships
Television shows filmed in the Bahamas
Television shows filmed in Cuba
Television shows filmed in Brazil
Television shows filmed in South Africa
Television shows filmed in Kenya
Television shows filmed in India
Television shows filmed in Malaysia
Television shows filmed in Vietnam
Television shows filmed in Hong Kong
Television shows filmed in Shanghai
Television shows filmed in Japan
Television shows filmed in Washington (state)